My Life is the autobiography of the British Fascist leader Sir Oswald Mosley. It was published in 1968.

Release
The book was published in 1968. To coincide with the release of the book, the BBC broadcast a Panorama special, seen by a record audience.

Topics, themes and treatment
The book is structured as a sequential memoir, but it doubles as the author's personal defence against charges of antisemitism, as well as a general overview of world politics, both during his ascent, and at the time of its publication in the 1960s.

My Life provides a close-up view of England's ruling class from an immensely rich man born into long-established nobility, and married to the daughter of Lord Curzon. Mosley chronicles the social life of the elite, and he gives impressions of political figures across the spectrum, from Churchill and H. H. Asquith to Bernard Shaw and James Maxton as well as some of the top Nazis, though he tries to distance himself from Hitler.

References

External links
Microsoft Reader version
Portable Document Format (pdf) version

1968 non-fiction books
Fascist books
Political autobiographies
Fascism in the United Kingdom
British autobiographies
Oswald Mosley